Tuaheni Point is a promontory on the east coast of the North Island of New Zealand. It marks the northernmost point of Poverty Bay, and is located close to the city of Gisborne. The small settlement of Wainui Beach lies just to the north of Tuaheni Point.

Headlands of the Gisborne District